Joc is the oldest folk dance ensemble of Moldova; full name: National Academic Ensemble of Folk Dance "Joc"() The Romanian word joc means "game, play (amusement activity)" and may refer to various festivities.

Joc was created on August 13, 1945, by Leonid Leonardi and Leonid Zeltsman, then called simply "ensemble of Moldovan dance".

In 1954-55, Tankho Israelov was the director of the dance ensemble.

Its 13th director (since 1957) was Vladimir Curbet.

Awards and recognition
1953: 1st place at the 4th World Festival of Youth and Students
1955:Meritorious ensemble of Moldavian SSR
1968: Lenin Komsomol Prize

References

Moldovan culture
Soviet culture